Discoverer 26, also known as Corona 9019, was an American optical reconnaissance satellite which was launched in 1961. It was the sixth of ten Corona KH-2 satellites, based on the Agena-B.

The launch of Discoverer 26 occurred at 23:29:48 UTC on 7 July 1961. A Thor DM-21 Agena-B rocket was used, flying from Launch Complex 75-3-5 at the Vandenberg Air Force Base. Upon successfully reaching orbit, it was assigned the Harvard designation 1961 Pi 1.

Images were recorded onto  film, and returned in a Satellite Recovery Vehicle, which was deorbited two days after launch. The Satellite Recovery Vehicle used by Discoverer 26 was SRV-511. Once its images had been returned, Discoverer 26's mission was complete, and it remained in orbit until it decayed on 5 December 1961.

References

Spacecraft launched in 1961
Spacecraft which reentered in 1961